The Pittsburgh Phantoms were an American professional basketball team whose office is based in the Pittsburgh suburb of Elizabeth, Pennsylvania. The Phantoms were a member of the current American Basketball Association, and began play in December, 2009. The Phantoms played their home games in Munhall, Pennsylvania at the Carnegie Library of Homestead - Athletic Club as well as the Langley High School Gymnasium. Although the Phantoms intended to play games in the ABA during the 2010-11 season, no games were held.  Despite problems with games not being held they did garner some fan support.

The Phantoms had originally planned to be a charter member of the Global Professional Basketball League before leaving for the ABA.

Year-by-year

References

External links 
Pittsburgh Phantoms

Defunct American Basketball Association (2000–present) teams
Allegheny County, Pennsylvania
Basketball teams in Pittsburgh
Basketball teams established in 2009
2009 establishments in Pennsylvania
Phantoms (Aba)
Defunct basketball teams in Pennsylvania
Sports clubs disestablished in 2010
2010 disestablishments in Pennsylvania